Vera Nikolaevna Zavadovskaya (née Apraksina, November 2, 1768 – November 22, 1845) was a Russian courtier. She served as maid of honour to empress Catherine the Great. She was married to Pyotr Zavadovsky and known for her love affair with Prince Ivan Baryatinsky and for being the mistress and muse of the poet Sergey Marin.

References 
 В апреле 1785 года у П. П. Нарышкина умерла его первая жена графиня Мария Николаевна Салтыкова (1766–1785), второй женой его стала в 1786 году Екатерина Николаевна Опочинина (1766–1851).

1768 births
1845 deaths
Ladies-in-waiting from the Russian Empire